Ticino, Ticinus, Ticinum can refer to:

Switzerland
 Canton of Ticino
 Ticino (wine region)

Comuni of north Italy
 Castelletto sopra Ticino
 Bernate Ticino
 Vizzola Ticino
 Borgo Ticino
 Boffalora sopra Ticino
 Carbonara al Ticino
 Santo Stefano Ticino

Further geographic uses
 Ticino River, tributary of the Po river, Italy/Switzerland
 Ticinum, ancient city now Pavia, Italy
 Ticino, settlement in General San Martín Department, Córdoba, Argentina

Miscellaneous
 Ticino (train), an international express train that connected Milan with Zurich or Basel
 Ticino franco, former unit of currency in Switzerland
 47164 Ticino, asteroid
 Regional Bus and Rail Company of Ticino
 Ticinese dialect
 Battle of Ticinus, 218 BC battle on the Ticino river, the first between Hannibal and the Romans
 Ticino League, political party in the canton of Ticino
 LaRegione Ticino, newspaper in the canton
 Corriere del Ticino, newspaper in the canton

See also
 Tessin (disambiguation)